Transportation systems management is a set of techniques used to increase the capacity of a piece of transportation infrastructure without increasing its physical size. Most often, these techniques are used in the context of roadways. In this context, transportation systems management techniques may include changes to traffic signals, such as coordinating them or introducing ramp metering, or minor changes to road geometry, such as straightening corners or lengthening merge lanes. These low-cost interventions can be very effective in reducing congestion under some circumstances.

Due to the low cost of transportation systems management, it is often included as a reference option in cost-benefit analyses and environmental impact statements for new roadways or mass transit links, such as busways, metros, and light rail lines. It is typically considered in conjunction with the default "no-build" option.

References 

Transportation planning
Traffic management
Enterprise resource planning terminology
Freight transport